María Eugenia Martínez de Irujo y Fitz-James Stuart, 12th Duchess of Montoro, GE (born 26 November 1968) is a Spanish aristocrat and socialite. Born in Madrid, she is the youngest and only daughter of Luis Martínez de Irujo y Artázcoz and Cayetana Fitz-James Stuart, 18th Duchess of Alba. The Duchess works in public relations for Tous Designer House. Her official seat of residence is at Liria Palace in Madrid, but she also spends time at her property La Pizana in Gerena, in the province of Sevilla.

Family
On October 23, 1998, the Duchess married Francisco Rivera Ordóñez at Seville Cathedral. He is a bullfighter and the eldest son of Francisco Rivera Pérez (known as "Paquirri"), also a matador, who was killed during a bullfight in 1984. His mother is Carmen Ordóñez, daughter of Antonio Ordóñez of the Ordóñez bullfighter family. The couple divorced in 2002, and had one child:
Doña Cayetana Rivera y Martínez de Irujo (b. 16 October 1999).

On November 17, 2017, the Duchess married Narcís Rebollo Melció, president of Universal Music Spain and Portugal. The wedding ceremony took place at A Little White Wedding Chapel in Las Vegas, Nevada.

Ancestry

Eugenia's patriline is the line from which he is descended father to son.
Patrilineal descent is the principle behind membership in Ducal Houses, as it can be traced back through the generations - which means that Eugenia’s historically accurate House name is Irujo.

Juan Martínez de Irujo
Martín Martínez de Irujo y Tavar, b. 1613
Juan Martínez de Irujo y Mearín, b. 1648
Francisco Martínez de Irujo y Éspoz, b. 1678
Manuel Martínez de Irujo y de Erice, b. 1718
Carlos Martínez de Irujo, 1st Marquis of Casa Irujo, 1763–1824
Carlos Martínez de Irujo, 2nd Marquis of Casa Irujo, 1803–1855
Carlos Martínez de Irujo, 8th Duke of Sotomayor, 1846–1909
Pedro Martínez de Irujo, 9th Duke of Sotomayor, 1882–1957
Luis Martínez de Irujo y Artázcoz, 1919–1972
Eugenia Martínez de Irujo, 12th Duchess of Montoro, b. 1968

Notes

References
Elenco de Grandezas y Títulos Nobiliarios Españoles, Hidalguía Editions, 2008
Auñamendi Entziklopedia
House of Híjar

|-

1968 births
Dukes of Montoro
Grandees of Spain
Eugenia
Living people
Spanish people of Basque descent